Aram Asatryan (3 March 1953 – 7 November 2006) was an Armenian singer and songwriter of Armenian pop and rabiz music, known for his energetic concerts. He is widely regarded as the pioneer of the "rabiz" music genre and to this day remains the most popular rabiz singer of all time.

Biography 
Aram Asatryan was born in Ejmiatsin (now known as Vagharshapat) on March 3, 1953 to Hapet Asatryan and Ashken Mampreyan. He was born to a refugee family.

Ever since his childhood years, Aram was recognized as a prodigal musician. In 1985, Asatryan formed his own band. Later in life, he gained fame for his distinct voice and musical styling, and was popular both in Armenia and the international community, particularly the Armenian diaspora . Asatryan loved to work and he devoted his life to music. He approached positive things and was confident about himself. His love for his country, the Armenian people, as well as other ethnic groups are expressed in his songs. During the First Nagorno-Karabakh War, he performed songs for the soldiers and Armenians in general to generate moral support.

Asatryan performed many concerts internationally (Asia, Europe, Russia, the Middle East), and in many cities in Armenia. He wrote over 500 songs and constantly held world tours. Throughout his life, he received many awards such as the "Gusan", which he was awarded on April 18, 2003 by the Cultural Music Ministry in Armenia. The "Gusan" award is the most prestigious award offered by the Cultural Music Ministry in Armenia.

Personal life 
Aram Asatryan was married to Nvart Gevorkyan and they had three sons, Artash, Tigran, Setrak, and a daughter, Zvart.

Until his death, Asatryan resided in the United States. He believed his music would pass on from generation to generation. His son Setrak (Seto) died in a tragic automobile accident approximately one year before Aram's death, which left Aram in a grieving state until his return to Armenia in 2006. His musical legacy is continued by his two sons, Tigran and Artash Asatryan, his nephew Hovhannes Asatryan, and his two grandsons, Arman and Grisha Asatryan.

Death
Aram Asatryan died on 7 November 2006 in Oshakan in the Aragatsotn region from an apparent heart attack. He was at a baptism being the godfather of an Armenian family. He did not show early symptoms of sickness as it was reported that he was in a very good and warm mood.

Dying surrounded by his close relatives, he was grieved by fans as he was considered one of the big names in Armenian pop music in modern times, and dubbed the "voice of Hayastan". The entire Asatryan family is considered to be a foremost contributor to the pop music of post-Soviet Armenia.

Discography

Studio albums
Asum En Heru (1985)
Vorkan Tsankatsan (1989)
Mer Hayrenik (1990)
The Best (1991)
Angakh Hayasdan (1992)
Music With Duduk (1993)
Indz Hamar (1993)
Puj Ashkhar (1993)
Nayir Ashkharin (1994)
Azat Hayasdan (1995)
Hye Es Du (1996)
The Golden Album (1997)
Los Angeles (1998)
Super Dance (1998)
Yet Dardzek Tariner (1999)
10 Tari Bemum (1999)
2000 Millennium (1999)
Ashkharoum Inchkan Hay Ka, Aynkan El Ka Yerevan (2000)
Re Mi X (2000)
The Very Best (2000)
Asem Te Casem (2001)
Im Yerke (2001)
Skizb (2002)
Urakh Tsragir (2002)
Urakh Tsragir 2 (2002)
Du Ashkhar Ekar (2003)
Siro Patmutyun (2004)
Anund (2005)
My Sons (2006)

Posthumous
Im Yerke Vol. 2 (2017)

Live albums
Aram and Armen Live (1998)
Alex 50 Golden Years (2003)
Live Concert in Armenia (2005)

Compilation albums
Sweet Memory’s (2002)
50 Years (2003)
The Best Of Aram Asatryan (2003)

References

External links 
 Aram Asatryan - Aram Asatryan Online Music Playlist
 Death
 a1plus death report
 
 Aram Asatryan Music Videos

1953 births
2006 deaths
People from Vagharshapat
20th-century Armenian male singers
21st-century Armenian male singers